Hubert Henry Norsworthy (1885 - 18 August 1961) was an organist and composer based in England.

Life

He was born in Haverigg, Millom in Cumberland in 1885, the son of John Henry Norsworthy and Annie Dawson.

During the First World War he served in the Royal Engineers.

He was Head Teacher at Derby School of Music from 1930-1938

He married Paulina Dickinson in 1920.

He died in Lancaster on 18 August 1961 and was buried in Skerton Municipal Cemetery.

Appointments

Organist of Hexham Abbey 1918
Organist of St. Luke's Church, Derby 1933 - 1942

Compositions

His compositions include: 
Nuptial Song for Organ 1905
Reverie in D flat for Organ 1907
Gavotte for Piano 1907
Meditation for Organ 1908
Chanson romantique for organ 1908
A Farewell Song. 1912
Priel 1913

References

1885 births
1961 deaths
English organists
British male organists
English composers
People from Millom
20th-century organists
20th-century British male musicians